Achryson pictum is a species of longhorn beetle in the Cerambycinae subfamily. It was described by Bates in 1870. It is known from French Guiana, northwestern Brazil, Ecuador, and Bolivia.

References

Achrysonini
Beetles described in 1870